Agrotis boetica is a moth of the  family Noctuidae. It is found in the desert regions of North Africa and southern Spain, with its range extending east to Israel.

Adults are on wing from October to November. There is one generation per year.

The larvae feed on Lithospermum, Echinops and Astragalus species.

References

Agrotis
Moths of Africa
Moths of Europe
Moths of the Middle East